Joseph O'Brien may refer to:

Joseph Patrick O'Brien (born 1993), Irish jockey and racehorse trainer
Joseph O'Brien (singer), American singer and songwriter
Joseph C. O'Brien (born 1965), mayor of Worcester, Massachusetts, USA
Joseph J. O'Brien (1897–1953), U.S. congressman from New York
Joseph Leonard O'Brien (1895–1973), lieutenant governor of New Brunswick
Joseph O'Brien (rower), Australian rower
Joe O'Brien (basketball) (born 1955), basketball player
Joe O'Brien (footballer) (1875 – after 1906), Scottish football full back
Joey O'Brien (born 1986), Irish international and former Bolton Wanderers footballer